Lifespan is a 1976 Dutch thriller film directed by Alexander Whitelaw and starring Hiram Keller, Tina Aumont and Klaus Kinski.

Plot
American Dr. Ben Land travels to Amsterdam to meet with Dr. Linden, an expert on aging who is supposedly close to a breakthrough. Unfortunately, Dr. Linden is discovered hanged and Ben is left with only baffling clues. He becomes intimate with Anna, who worked as a bondage model for the doctor. In an extended and controversial scene, the two engage in light shibari bondage of Anna, the first such instance of bondage in mainstream media. Later, Ben discovers that Anna knows more than she should about the mysterious 'Swiss man', Nicholas Ulrich.

Cast
 Hiram Keller as Dr. Ben Land
 Tina Aumont as Anna
 Klaus Kinski as Nicholas Ulrich
 Adrian Brine as Dr. Winston
 Rudi Falkenhagen as Police inspector
 Rudolf Lucieer as Journalist
 Sacco van der Made as Animal feeder
 Paul Melton as Journalist
 Helen van Meurs as Psychiatrist
 Onno Molenkamp as Director of old age home
 Frans Mulder as Pim Henke
 Lydia Polak as Lydia
 Fons Rademakers as Prof. van Arp
 Joan Remmelts as Family doctor
 Dick Scheffer as Official from ministry of science
Linden
 André van den Heuvel as Felix Dolda
 Albert Van Doorn as Emile van der Lutte

References

External links

1976 films
1970s thriller films
English-language Dutch films
1970s English-language films